This is a list of extrasolar planets that have been directly observed, sorted by observed separations. This method works best for young planets that emit infrared light and are far from the glare of the star.  Currently, this list includes both directly imaged planets and imaged planetary-mass companions (objects that orbit a star but formed through a binary-star-formation process, not a planet-formation process). This list does not include free-floating planetary-mass objects in star-forming regions or young associations, which are also referred to as rogue planets.

The data given for each planet is taken from the latest published paper on the planet to have that data. In many cases it is not possible to have an exact value, and an estimated range is instead provided. The lightest, coldest, and oldest planet directly imaged is Proxima Centauri c, which has seven times Earth's mass, an effective temperature of 39 K, and an age of about 4.8Ga.
This list includes the four members of the multi-planet system that orbit HR 8799.

Key
Exoplanets have been discovered using several different methods for collecting or combining direct images to isolate planets from the background light of their star. Non-Redundant Aperture Masking Interferometry is a method of combining the views of multiple telescopes into a single image, while the other methods are algorithms for combining multiple direct images taken from the same telescope.

 ADI = Angular Differential Imaging
KLIP = Karhunen–Loève Image Processing
 LOCI = Locally Optimized Combination of Images
 NRM = Non-Redundant Aperture Masking Interferometry
 RSDI = Reference Star Differential Imaging
SDI = Spectral Differential Imaging
 TLOCI = Template Locally Optimized Combination of Images

Exoplanets
Although listed in the table below, the identities of Fomalhaut b and Candidate 1 are disputed. They may not actually be true exoplanets.
  †   There is no consensus whether these companions of stars should be considered sub-brown dwarfs or planets
Check https://exoplanetarchive.ipac.caltech.edu/docs/imaging.html to see more directly imaged planets. It contains an updated table of all of them.

See also 
 Lists of exoplanets
 List of largest exoplanets
 List of nearest exoplanets
 List of nearest terrestrial exoplanet candidates
 List of potentially habitable exoplanets
 List of stars with resolved images

References

External links 

 
 
 https://www.eso.org/public/images/potw1624a/ - Retrieved 2016-06-16

 
Directly imaged exoplanets
Astronomy image articles